Needy, also known as Hardscrabble, is an unincorporated community in Clackamas County, Oregon, United States. James H. Brents gave the community its names, which may be such because of its poverty. Needy's post office was established on February 16, 1885 and John M. Bacon was its postmaster. It closed on September 19, 1903. It is now served by the Canby post office.

References

Unincorporated communities in Clackamas County, Oregon
1885 establishments in Oregon
Populated places established in 1885
Unincorporated communities in Oregon